Michael Holden (born 13 March 1968) is a British former professional boxer who competed from 1994 to 2012. He held the British heavyweight title in 2000.

Career
Born in Ashton-under-Lyne and based in Manchester, Holden began his professional career in October 1994 with a 4th round stoppage of Gary Williams. After a win and two defeats from his next three fights he fought Julius Francis in July 1996, losing on points. He also did some acting work, including as an extra in Coronation Street. He won five of his next six fights, earning him a shot at the British title in March 2000 that was then held by Francis; Holden won on points to become British champion. Only two months earlier Holden had acted as bodyguard for Francis during the latter's fight against Mike Tyson and acted as a sparring partner for Francis. After being forced to relinquish his title, he fought Francis again in April 2001 in a fight for the vacant WBO Inter-Continental heavyweight title that was also a final eliminator for the British title; This time Francis got the points decision. In September Holden fought Keith Long in another eliminator for the British title but again lost on points. Holden won only two more fights and lost three of his last five fights, including defeats to Michael Sprott and Matt Skelton, the latter a fight for the vacant English title in 2003, after which he retired.

After retiring from boxing, Holden joined the police force. In 2008 he began training for a comeback and sparred with Tyson Fury. He made his return to the ring in September 2009 against Tomáš Mrázek, a boxer who had lost 22 of 28 fights. The 4-round fight ended in a draw. In 2010 Holden was scheduled to compete in television knockout series but was omitted at the last minute Prizefighter. Holden returned again in 2012 to fight the undefeated Dillian Whyte, with Whyte winning by a TKO in the third round after putting Holden down three times.

References

1968 births
Living people
Sportspeople from Ashton-under-Lyne
English male boxers
Heavyweight boxers